Durrës County, officially the County of Durrës, is a county in the Northern Region of the Republic of Albania. The county borders on the Adriatic Sea to the west, the counties of Lezhë to the north, Dibër to the east and Tirana to the south. It is divided into three municipalities, Durrës, Krujë and Shijak, with all of whom incorporate sixteen administrative units.

The county has geographically a coastline on the Albanian Adriatic Sea Coast and extends in the Western Lowlands on a flat alluvial and coastal plain. The east is characterised by the Skanderbeg Mountains which splits the Western Lowlands from the Central Mountain Range. Its climate is profoundly determined by its proximity to the Mediterranean Sea and its considerable change in terrain.

The central city Durrës is one of largest cities on the Adriatic Sea and ranks 5th with a population of 175,110 and one of the world's oldest continuously inhabited cities. Durrës is home to Albania's main port, the Port of Durrës. The port is also the 10th largest cargo port on the Adriatic Sea that handle more than 3.4 million tonnes of cargo per year. The historical city of Krujë is the second largest city in Durrës County.

Geography 

The county lies between latitudes 41° and 23° N and longitudes 19° and 30° E.

Because of its proximity to the Mediterranean Sea, several rivers, large and small, flow throughout the county. The Ishëm is the longest river in the county originating at the Skanderbeg Mountains in Tirana County and flowing through the county until it reaches the Adriatic Sea at the Cape of Rodon along the Gulf of Drin. The Erzen, the second longest river in the county, begins nearby the village of Shëngjergj, flows into northwest and empties into the sea at the Gjiri i Lalzit.

The city of Krujë is found at an altitude of 600 m (1,969 ft) on the foot of Mount Krujë of the Krujë Gorge, while south and west of the town is found the plain of the Ishëm River. The town is located in the northern part of the outer Albanides tectonic unit, which consists of anticlines of Mesozoic carbonate platforms.

Climate 

The climate is generally Mediterranean but varies by local topography. There are diverse microclimates in the county. Summers are dry while heavy rains are experienced during the winter.

Demography 

Durrës County is the second most populous and densely populated county of the Republic of Albania, with an increasing number of population. The Institute of Statistics (INSTAT) estimated the county's population in January 2021 at 292,029. At the 2011 census, there were 263,711 people living in the county with a population density of 343 people per square kilometres.

As of the 2011 census, in terms of ethnicity, Durrës County was 77.54% Albanian, 0.36% Romani, 0.18% Greek, 0.07% Macedonian, 0.05% Aromanian, 0.02% Egyptian and 0.02% Montenegrin. By language, 99.5% spoke Albanian as a first language. Other spoken languages were Romani (0.12%), Greek (0.05%), Macedonian (0.05%), Italian (0.02%), Turkish (0.02%) and Aromanian (0.02%). By religion, there were 177,274 (67.46%) Muslims, 19,322 (7.35%) Roman Catholics, 8,675 (3.30%) Eastern Orthodox, 4,215 (1.60%) Bektashis, 325 (0.12%) Evangelists, 167 (0.06%) other Christians, 9,131 (3.47%) believers without denomination and 41 (0.02%) of other religions. Nonetheless, 2,901 people (1.10%) were irreligious while 33,754 (12.84%) did not declare their religion.

Settlements 

There are three municipalities (bashkia) and 16 administrative units (njësi administrative) incorporated in Durrës County. The majority of its population is predominantly concentrated in the county's capital city of Durrës. As of the 2011 Census, the population of the administrative unit Durrës stands at 113,249 with the adjacent eponymous municipality having a population of 175,110. Other units with a population over 10,000 include Fushë-Krujë, Katund i Ri, Kodër-Thumanë, Krujë, Rrashbull, Sukth and Xhafzotaj.

See also 

 Geography of Albania
 Politics of Albania
 Divisions of Albania

References 

 
Durrës